Niccolò Paganini (1782–1840) was an Italian violinist, violist, guitarist and composer.

Paganini may also refer to:

Music
 Paganini (operetta), an operetta by Franz Lehár
 Paganini Competition, a violin competition started in 1954
 Paganini Quartet, a string quartet started in 1946
 Paganini (band), a Swiss hard rock band

Films
 Paganini (1923 film), a German silent historical film 
 Paganini (1934 film), also known as I Liked Kissing Women
 Paganini (1989 film), also known as Kinski Paganini

People
 Alexia Paganini, Swiss-American figure skater
 Fernando Paganini, Uruguayan engineer
 Luca Paganini, Italian footballer
 Omar Paganini, Uruguayan electrical engineer
 Paganino Paganini (c. 1450–1538), Italian publisher
 Sam Paganini, Italian DJ 
 Tamara Paganini, Argentine dancer and actress
 Ricardo Paganini, Argentine rugby union player

Other uses
 Paganini, a typeface by Nebiolo Printech
 2859 Paganini, a minor planet named after the violinist

See also
 Nicolò Paganini (disambiguation)